Kyprios (foaled 18 May 2018) is an Irish Thoroughbred racehorse. He was lightly raced in his early career, winning one race from two starts in each of his first two seasons. As a four-year-old in 2022 he emerged as a top-class stayer, winning the Vintage Crop Stakes and Saval Beg Stakes in Ireland before taking the Ascot Gold Cup, Goodwood Cup, Irish St. Leger and Prix du Cadran.

Background
Kyprios is a chestnut colt with a broad white blaze and two white socks bred by the Moyglare Stud. He races in the ownership of Moyglare Stud in partnership with Coolmore Stud's Michael Tabor and Susan Magnier. In 2022 the horse's ownership team was joined by Georg von Opel. The colt was sent into training with Aidan O'Brien at Ballydoyle.

He was from the sixteenth crop of foals sired by Galileo, who won the Derby, Irish Derby and King George VI and Queen Elizabeth Stakes in 2001. His other progeny include Australia, Frankel, Waldgeist, Nathaniel, New Approach, Rip Van Winkle, Found, Minding and Ruler of the World. Kyprios's dam, Polished Gem won one minor race from five attempts, but has been a very successful broodmare, producing several other winners including Search For A Song, Free Eagle, Sapphire (British Champions Fillies and Mares Stakes) and Custom Cut (Sandown Mile). Polished Gem is a daughter of the Irish 1,000 Guineas winner Trusted Partner.

Racing career

2020: two-year-old season
Kyprios began his racing career in an eight and a half furlong maiden race on heavy ground at Galway Racecourse on 8 September when he started at odds of 9/4 in a seven-runner field. Ridden by Seamie Heffernan he settled just behind the leaders before producing a sustained late run to take the lead in the final strides and win by three quarters of a length from Lifetime Legend. A month later the colt was sent to England and moved up sharply in class to contest the Group 3 Zetland Stakes over ten furlongs at Newmarket Racecourse. With Ryan Moore in the saddle he started favourite but never looked likely to win and came home sixth of the eight runners behind Lone Eagle, beaten more than sixteen lengths by the winner.

2021: three-year-old season
On 23 April Kyprios began his second season in the Blackwater Race over ten furlongs at Cork Racecourse when he was ridden by Heffernan and started the  15/2 fourth choice in a six-runner field. In a rough race, Kyprios hung to the right in the straight, recovered after being bumped by a rival, gained the advantage a furlong out and won by half a length from O'Reilly. Moore was in the saddle two weeks later when the colt was sent to England for a second time and started 7/2 second favourite for the Novibet Derby Trial Stakes over one and a half miles at Lingfield Park. He was in contention for most of the way but faded in the closing stages and finished fourth, ten lengths behind the winner Third Realm.

Kyprios was sent to Royal Ascot to contest the Queen's Vase over fourteen furlongs but was withdrawn from the race after becoming distressed and breaking out of the starting stalls. He sustained bad bruising to his back and missed the rest of the season.

2022: four-year-old season
Kyprios began his third campaign in the Listed Vintage Crop Stakes over fourteen furlongs at Navan Racecourse on 23 April when he was ridden by Moore and started the 5/1 second favourite behind his older sister Search For A Song in a nine-runner field which also included Baron Samedi (Belmont Gold Cup Stakes) and Leo De Fury (Mooresbridge Stakes). Kyprios settled in second place behind the pacemaker Effernock Fizz before taking the lead inside the last quarter mile and after repelling a challenge from Search For A Song he drew away in the closing stages to beat his sister into second place by two and three quarter lengths. After the race O'Brien said: “We always thought he was going to be very nice. He went to Ascot last year and jumped out under the stalls and he hasn’t run since then. He looks like a stayer with a bit of class, he relished that trip. We liked him a lot last year and he has done well since then. He relaxes and he quickens."

On 13 May only three horses appeared to oppose Kyprios when he started at odd of 1/10 for the Group 3 Saval Beg Stakes over fourteen furlongs at the Leopardstown Racecourse. With Moore in the saddle he led from the start, drew away in the last quarter mile and won by fourteen lengths from the five-year-old Sunchart. O'Brien's representative Chris Armstrong commented "Aidan is very happy with him. He’s progressing nicely this year and has stepped up again from his last run. It was always the plan to go Navan, then here for the Saval Beg and head on to the Gold Cup at Ascot. It’s a tried and tested route so hopefully he follows in the footsteps and fingers crossed the next stop will be Ascot... His last furlong was probably his best. He was out in front and probably a bit idle but he really stretched in the last furlong."

The 2022 edition of the Ascot Gold Cup was run over two and a half miles on good to firm ground at Royal Ascot on 16 June and Kyprios, ridden by Moore, started the 13/8 favourite. His eight opponents were headed by Stradivarius and also included Princess Zoe, Mojo Star (runner-up in the Epsom Derby), Burning Victory (Triumph Hurdle) and Bubble Smart (Prix Gladiateur). Kyprios settled in mid-division as the outsiders Earlofthecotswolds and Tashkhan set the pace, before moving to the outside and making progress approaching the final turn. He took the lead two furlongs from the finish and fought off a sustained challenge from Mojo Star to win by half a length, with Stradivarius a further three quarters of a length back in third place. Aidan O'Brien said "We think he's a horse who is going to come forward again. He's brave, genuine and a great horse. Ryan gave him a marvellous ride and had belief in him. When he really wanted him, he answered." Moore said that the horse had not been suited by the slow pace commenting "It wasn't a nice race to ride. I didn't like the spot we were in as we were going slow. They were getting an easy time up front and I had to move him to the outside – I don't like doing that. We got going and got to the front, and when Mojo Star has come to us, that's when he's clicked in. It wasn't a true test today but he was much the best and there will be lots of good days with him."

Kyprios followed up his success with victory in the Group I Goodwood Cup in July, once again seeing off a hard-charging Stradivarius in a close finish.

Pedigree

Kyprios is inbred 3 × 4 to Northern Dancer, meaning that this stallion appears once in the third generation and once in the fourth generation of his pedigree.

References

2018 racehorse births
Racehorses bred in Ireland
Racehorses trained in Ireland
Thoroughbred family 9-f
Irish Classic Race winners
Cartier Award winners